Emmanuel Briffa (September 4, 1875 – 1955) was a Maltese Canadian theatre decorator whose career in North America spanned thirty years, starting in 1912.

Devoted almost entirely to theatre decoration since immigrating to North America from Malta in 1912, Briffa spent several years working in the United States prior to moving to Canada in 1924. In Canada, Briffa established himself as one of the most sought after theatre decorators, decorating approximately one hundred theatres.

Quebec

His cinema designs in Quebec included the Louis XVI style design for the Rialto Theatre, a National Historic Site of Canada, the former Snowdon Theatre, Seville Theatre, Cinema V, York Theatre as well as the Granada Theatre in Sherbrooke, Quebec, also a National Historic Site.

After his death in 1955, he was entombed at the Notre Dame des Neiges Cemetery in Montreal.

References

External links
Concordia Fine Arts

Canadian interior designers
Maltese emigrants to Canada
Maltese artists
1875 births
1955 deaths
Theatre architects
Persons of National Historic Significance (Canada)
Canadian scenic designers
People from Birkirkara
Burials at Notre Dame des Neiges Cemetery
Canadian theatre designers